Addition and subtraction may refer to:

 Addition
 Subtraction

Addition and Subtraction is a 1900 French film.